Chalcothea is a genus of flower chafers belonging to the family scarab beetles.

Description
The body is oblong, with distinct "neck" between head and pronotum. Elytra are metallic green and much broader than pronotum.

Distribution
Species within this genus are present in the Southeast Asia.

Species
 Chalcothea affinis Snellen van Vollenhoven, 1858
 Chalcothea fruhstorferi Kraatz, 1891
 Chalcothea resplendens (Gory & Percheron, 1833)
 Chalcothea smaragdina (Gory & Percheron, 1833)
 Chalcothea sumatrana Antoine, 2000

References

Cetoniinae
Scarabaeidae genera